Nuno Camarneiro (born August 17, 1977), is a Portuguese novelist born in Figueira da Foz, Portugal.

Biography

Nuno Camarneiro was born in Figueira da Foz, Portugal, in 1977. He holds a degree in Physics Engineering by the University of Coimbra, worked at CERN and got his Ph.D. by the University of Florence. He teaches at the Portucalense University at Oporto. In 2011 he published his first novel "No Meu Peito Não Cabem Pássaros" and, in 2013, "Debaixo de Algum Céu", which won the Prémio Leya.

Bibliography

 No Meu Peito Não Cabem Pássaros (Dom Quixote), Junho de 2011
 Debaixo de Algum Céu (LeYa), Abril 2013

References
Expresso
Leya

External links
 Personal Blog

1977 births
People associated with CERN
Living people
Portuguese male writers
People from Figueira da Foz